Giulio Brogi (3 May 1935 – 19 February 2019) was an Italian actor. He appeared in 39 films and television shows beginning in 1967. He starred in the 1974 film Morel's Invention, which also starred Anna Karina.

Selected filmography
 The Subversives (1967)
 Galileo (1968)
 Days of Fire (1968)
 Under the Sign of Scorpio (1969)
 The Seven Headed Lion (1970)
 The Spider's Stratagem (1970)
 Eneide (1971)
 St. Michael Had a Rooster (1972)
 Morel's Invention (1974)
 Gamma (1975)
 Quanto è bello lu murire acciso (1976)
 Il gabbiano (1977)
 The Meadow (1979)
 Voyage to Cythera (1984)
 The Yes Man (1991)
 The Secret of the Old Woods (1993)
 Holy Tongue (2000)

References

External links

1935 births
2019 deaths
Italian male film actors
20th-century Italian male actors
Actors from Verona